Parliamentary elections were held in the Federated States of Micronesia on 27 March 1979. All candidates for seats in Congress ran as independents.

Electoral system
The 14-member Congress consisted of four at-large members (one from each state) elected for four-year terms, and ten other members elected for two-year terms.

Results

Aftermath
Following the elections, the newly elected Congress met for the first time on 10 May. Bethwel Henry was elected Speaker. Members of Congress subsequently elected Tosiwo Nakayama as the first President of Micronesia, with Petrus Tun elected vice-president. This led to both vacating their seats in Congress. In the subsequent by-elections on 13 June, Koichi Sana was elected to the four-year seat in Truk and John Haglelgam (a write-in candidate) was elected in the four-year seat in Yap.

References

Micronesia
1979 in the Federated States of Micronesia
Elections in the Federated States of Micronesia
Non-partisan elections